Jordi Jordana Rossell  (born 8 March 1960) is an Andorran lawyer and politician. He is a member of the Liberal Party of Andorra. He has worked as a judge and heads a small law firm.

References

Members of the General Council (Andorra)
1960 births
Living people
Andorran judges
Liberal Party of Andorra politicians
Andorran lawyers